The Red Week was an unsuccessful attempt to start a socialist revolution in the Netherlands in early November 1918. The revolutionary attempt lasted nearly a week, from 9 to 14 November, which is why it is known as the Red Week. It is also known as "Troelstra's mistake" (Vergissing van Troelstra), because it was led by the Dutch socialist Pieter Jelles Troelstra.

Background
The call for a socialist revolution in November 1918 was inspired by the Russian Revolution of 1917 and the German Revolution of 1918–1919. It was also a reaction to the social and economic conditions of the Netherlands at that time, especially the 1918 flu pandemic and the poverty, unemployment, food shortage and distress caused by World War I in which the Netherlands had remained neutral.

Events

On 25 October 1918, soldiers in  started a revolt. It was quickly extinguished, but made a deep impression on Troelstra. He saw the event as an opportunity to realize the socialist revolution. Troelstra expressed his opinion in a conference of the Dutch Social Democratic Workers' Party (SDAP), but the rest of the party leaders did not support his opinion, claiming that the time was not yet right.

On 9 November, the German Emperor Wilhelm II abdicated. On 11 November they presented their demands to the mayor. Troelstra was very impressed by the demands, willing to go further. According to Willem Drees (later Dutch prime minister), Troelstra spoke about "taking over power" and "revolution", and claimed that the time had come for it.

The government quickly reacted. Armed police officers were stationed in Utrecht and in Amsterdam, and the royal family was secured. On 11 November, Catholic organizations met in The Hague and started a counter-campaign, included spreading of 500,000 pamphlets. Protestants and moderate socialists joined the counter-movement because they feared the extremism of a socialist revolution. Based on national and loyalist sentiments, the reaction was named "Orange Movement" (Oranjebeweging), after the Dutch royal family Orange-Nassau.

Ruijs de Beerenbrouck called on the socialists to cooperate with the government and argued that violence would be disruptive. He threatened that if the citizens would not behave properly, the ration would not be increased.

After that speech, Troelstra gave a long speech in parliament in which he incited a revolution and declared that the time had come for the workers to assume control of the government. Consequently, more troops were sent to the major cities (Rotterdam, Amsterdam and The Hague). On the night of 13 November, the counter-movement hung posters which stated that the revolutionaries were only a small minority. By that time, it was clear that the attempted revolution had failed.

See also
 Pieter Jelles Troelstra
 Social Democratic Workers' Party (Netherlands)
 Socialism in the Netherlands

References

Further reading

External links
 

1918 in the Netherlands
Socialism in the Netherlands
Political history of the Netherlands
Revolutions of 1917–1923
1918 riots
November 1918 events
Subsidiary conflicts of World War I